La Bâtie-Neuve is a commune in the Hautes-Alpes department in southeastern France.

Location
It is close to Gap.

Population

See also
Communes of the Hautes-Alpes department

References

Communes of Hautes-Alpes